The death of Henry Hale Bliss (June 13, 1830 – September 14, 1899) was the first recorded instance of a person being killed in a motor vehicle collision in the United States.

Death
On September 13, 1899, at West 74th Street and Central Park West in New York City, Henry Hale Bliss, a 69-year-old local real estate dealer, was alighting from a south bound 8th Avenue trolley car when an electric-powered taxicab (Automobile No. 43) struck him. Bliss hit the pavement, crushing his head and chest. He was taken by ambulance to Roosevelt Hospital, but upon arrival the house surgeon, Dr. Marny, said his injuries were too severe to survive, and Bliss died from his sustained injuries the next morning.

Arthur Smith, the driver of the taxicab, claimed that a large truck occupied the right side of the avenue, making it necessary to drive his vehicle closer to the car. Smith was arrested and charged with manslaughter, but was subsequently acquitted on the grounds that he had no malice, nor was he negligent.

The passenger of the taxi-cab, Dr. David Orr Edson, was the son of former New York City mayor Franklin Edson.

Legacy
A plaque was dedicated at the site on September 13, 1999, to commemorate the centenary of this event. It reads:

The ceremony was attended by his great-granddaughter, who placed roses on the place where Bliss was struck.

Family 
Bliss's stepdaughter, Mary Alice Altmont Livingston, who assumed the surname "Fleming", was later tried for the murder of her mother, Bliss's ex-wife, Evelina Bliss, by means of poisoned chowder. She was found innocent.

See also 
 Mary Ward – (1827–1869) Anglo-Irish scientist, the first person known to have been killed by a car, Ireland, 1869. Also the first person killed by a car in the United Kingdom and in the entire Western Hemisphere.
 Bridget Driscoll – (1851/1852–1896) the first pedestrian to be killed in a collision with a car in Great Britain.
 Elaine Herzberg – the first pedestrian to be killed in an autonomous motor car crash

Notes

References

External links
 
 
 Citystreets.org - Henry Bliss Plaque

1899 deaths
American real estate businesspeople
Deaths by person in New York City
Pedestrian road incident deaths
Road incident deaths in New York City
1830 births